The following are the Special Awards given by the MAMA Awards.

Popularity/People's Choice Awards

Mnet PD's Choice/Judges' Choice

Professional/Technical-related Awards

Global awards

Performance Awards

Style in Music

Discovery of the Year

Best of Next

Others

Notes
 Each year is linked to the article about the Mnet Asian Music Awards held that year.

References
 "M.net Korean Music Festival Winners list by year". MAMA. Retrieved 2014-06-12.
 "M.net Korean Music Festival Broadcasts by year". MAMA. Retrieved 2014-06-19.
 "M.net Korean Music Festival Photos by year". MAMA. Retrieved 2014-06-19.

External links
 Mnet Asian Music Awards official website

MAMA Awards